A Startup Weekend (also known as Startupweekend or SW) is a 54-hour entrepreneurship educational competitive event, in which groups of participants form teams around ideas the Friday evening, and work during the weekend to develop a working prototype, demo, and VC presentation by Sunday evening. Startup Weekend is a hackathon like event with a global presence. As of December 2016, it has reached 135 countries, involving over 210,000 entrepreneurs. Upon its 2015 acquisition, Startup Weekend, alongside Startup Week and StartupDigest, became one of the Techstars family of startup programs.

History
Founded in July 2007 in Boulder, Colorado by Andrew Hyde, Startup Weekend brought together 70 entrepreneurs to try to create a startup in just 54 hours. The model quickly expanded to cities around the world. 

In January 2010, Marc Nager and Clint Nelsen took over full ownership and registered the organization as a not-for-profit, relocating to Seattle. As of the acquisition, Startup Weekend had organized approximately 80 events in the USA, England, Germany and Canada. In February 2010, Franck Nouyrigat joined as a Co-Director and CTO. In the fall of 2010, Startup Weekend gained 501c3 status and received a grant from the Kauffman Foundation. 

By December 2010, the organization was composed of 8 full-time employees, over 15 'Key Facilitators', and more than 100 local organizers. In 2011, Startup Weekend launched the StartUp Foundation Initiative in partnership with the Ewing Marion Kauffman Foundation. In June 2012, Startup Weekend opened its first regional offices in London and Mexico City. By 2016, Startup Weekend events ran in over 1000 cities around the world.

Event model
Startup Weekend events span the course of a weekend (approximately 54 hours), and are generally composed of 60-120 participants (although events in the past have ranged from 13 to 300+). In addition to attendees (otherwise known as 'Weekend Warriors'), the event includes speakers, coaches, panelists (generally well-respected members of the local startup community or notable names in the tech industry), and various sponsors and company representatives. A good share of teams end up working together beyond the startup weekend to build a fully operating startup and others take with them the bootcamp experience and a network of like minds.

The groups of participants composed of developers, business managers, startup enthusiasts, marketing experts, graphic artists and more pitch ideas for new startup companies, form teams around those ideas, and work to develop a working prototype, demo, or presentation by Sunday evening.

StartupWeekend can be open themed or themed around a specific vertical, the main vertical that appears are : social innovation, IoT, artificial intelligence, Fintech, woman, retail, etc. When a vertical is common to multiple events, global editions can be created by global organisers. Global editions create a following competition between the winners of local editions.

Global Startup Battle
Startup Weekend launched the Global Startup Battle format in 2011 during Global Entrepreneurship Week. The 2012 battle included 10,000+ participants, 1,200+ teams, taking place in 100+ cities around the world. Global Startup Battle has three phases: First, the team must win the local Startup Weekend. Second, the team must win a Facebook popularity contest by receiving votes. 

Only the top 15 teams move on to the final stage. The final stage is a judging panel. In 2016, Global Startup Battle, shifted to become Global Startup Weekend, a world-wide celebration of Startup Weekends.

See also

Techstars
StartupDigest
Pilot (educational organization)

References

External links
 

Entrepreneurship organizations
Software development events
Business organizations based in the United States